Coal River is a river in southern Tasmania. With headwaters near Tunnack, it flows through the Coal River Valley and the town of Richmond, and empties into Pitt Water. In Richmond, the river is crossed by the historically significant Richmond Bridge, the oldest bridge built in Australia that is still in use.

Under the Nature Conservation Act of 2002 a part of Pitt Water was declared a nature reserve. The reserve is partially contained within the Pitt Water-Orielton Lagoon Ramsar Site, which, in 1983, was listed as a wetland of international importance under the Ramsar convention. The reserve is the habitat of migratory and resident birds, is a nursery of marine life and is an important estuarine ecosystem, and includes many unique species.

References

External links

Rivers of Tasmania